"Traitor" is the first episode of second season of the British BBC anthology TV series Play for Today. The episode was a television play that was originally broadcast on 14 October 1971. "Traitor" was written by Dennis Potter, directed by Alan Bridges, produced by Graeme MacDonald, and starred John Le Mesurier as Adrian Harris, a character loosely based on Kim Philby. Le Mesurier's performance won him the British Academy Television Award for Best Actor in 1972.

Plot

Western journalists visit Moscow to interview Adrian Harris, a former controller in British intelligence who was also a double agent for the Soviet Union. Harris believes in both Communism and Englishness, believing himself to have betrayed his class, but not his country. The press find these beliefs incompatible, and want to find out why he became a ‘traitor’. Harris is plagued by anxieties over both his actions and his upper-class childhood, and drinks to a state of collapse.

Cast

 Adrian Harris – John Le Mesurier
 James – Jack Hedley
 Simpson – Vincent Ball
 Blake – Neil McCallum
 Thomas – Jon Laurimore
 Sir Arthur Harris – Lyndon Brook
 Lady Emma – Diana Fairfax
 Michaelov – Richard Marner
 Duty clerk – Terence Bayler
 Craig – John Quentin
 Schoolmaster – John Saunders
 Young Adrian – Sean Maddox

Reception

Better known for comedic roles, Le Mesurier's casting was a brave move, one which initially concerned the actor who "was very, very scared" that "he wouldn’t be able to pull it off". Le Mesurier would later call the role 'the best part I ever had on TV'. While reviews of the play were mixed, critics were unanimous in their praise for Le Mesurier and he won the British Academy Television Award for Best Actor in 1972.

References

External links
 

1971 British television episodes
1971 television plays
British television plays
Play for Today